Ukraine has formal relations with many nations and in recent decades has been establishing diplomatic relations with an expanding circle of nations. The foreign relations of Ukraine are guided by a number of key priorities outlined in the foreign policy of Ukraine.

Western relations
Ukraine considers Euro-Atlantic integration its primary foreign policy objective, but in practice balances its relationship with Europe and the United States while attempting to sever its considerable ties to Russia. The European Union's Partnership and Cooperation Agreement (PCA) with Ukraine went into force on March 1, 1998. The European Union (EU) has encouraged Ukraine to implement the PCA fully before discussions begin on an association agreement. The EU Common Strategy toward Ukraine, issued at the EU Summit in December 1999 in Helsinki, recognizes Ukraine's long-term aspirations but does not discuss association. 

On January 31, 1992, Ukraine joined the then-Conference on Security and Cooperation in Europe (now the Organization for Security and Cooperation in Europe—OSCE), and on March 10, 1992, it became a member of the North Atlantic Cooperation Council. Ukraine also has a close relationship with NATO and has declared interest in eventual membership. It is the most active member of the Partnership for Peace (PfP). Former President Viktor Yushchenko indicated that he supports Ukraine joining the EU in the future. Plans for Ukrainian membership to NATO were shelved by Ukraine following the 2010 Ukrainian presidential election in which Viktor Yanukovych was elected President. 

Yanukovych opted to keep Ukraine a non-aligned state. This materialized on June 3, 2010 when the Ukrainian parliament (Verkhovna Rada) excluded, with 226 votes, the goal of "integration into Euro-Atlantic security and NATO membership" from the country's national security strategy giving the country a non-aligned status. "European integration" has remained part of Ukraine's national security strategy and co-operation with NATO was not excluded. 

Ukraine then considered relations with NATO as a partnership. Ukraine and NATO continued to hold joint seminars and joint tactical and strategical exercises. After February 2014's Yanukovych ouster and the Russian military intervention in Ukraine, the nation has renewed its drive for NATO membership. On 23 December 2014 the Verkhovna Rada abolished, with 303 votes, Ukraine's non-aligned status.

Relations with CIS states
Ukraine's relations with Russia are complicated by energy dependence and by payment arrears. However, relations improved with the 1998 ratification of the bilateral Treaty of Friendship and Cooperation. The two sides have signed a series of agreements on the final division and disposition of the former Soviet Black Sea Fleet that helped to reduce tensions. However, Ukraine cut diplomatic relations with Russia as a response to the Russian invasion of Ukraine.

Ukraine became a (non-official) member of the Commonwealth of Independent States (CIS) on December 8, 1991. In January 1993 it refused to endorse a draft charter strengthening political, economic, and defense ties among CIS members, and completely ceased to participate as a member in March 2014. Ukraine was a founding member of GUAM (Georgia-Ukraine-Azerbaijan-Moldova).

In 1999–2001, Ukraine served as a non-permanent member of the UN Security Council. Soviet Ukraine joined the United Nations in 1945 as one of the original members following a Western compromise with the Soviet Union, which had asked for seats for all 15 of its union republics. Ukraine has consistently supported peaceful, negotiated settlements to disputes. It has participated in the quadripartite talks on the conflict in Moldova and promoted a peaceful resolution to conflict in the post-Soviet state of Georgia. Ukraine also has made a substantial contribution to UN peacekeeping operations since 1992.

Leonid Derkach (chairman of the SBU, which is Ukraine's security service, successor to the KGB) was fired due to Western pressure after he organized the sale of radar systems to Iraq while such sales were embargoed.

International disputes

Belarus

The 1997 boundary treaty with Belarus remains un-ratified due to unresolved financial claims, stalling demarcation and reducing border security.

Russia

Delimitation of the land boundary with Russia is incomplete, but the parties have agreed to defer demarcation. The maritime boundary through the Sea of Azov and the Kerch Strait remains unresolved despite a December 2003 framework agreement and on-going expert-level discussions. Prime Minister Vladimir Putin allegedly declared at a NATO-Russia summit in 2008 that if Ukraine would join NATO his country can contend to annex the Ukrainian East and Crimea , Now in 2023 Russia has already annexed the Crimean peninsula and Four regions of Ukraine, Donetsk, Luhansk, Kherson and Zaporizhzhia  .

Starting in November 2013, the decision by Ukrainian President Viktor Yanukovych to back out of signing an integration agreement with the European Union started a period of civil unrest between Ukrainians who favored integration with the European Union and those who wanted closer ties with Russia. This culminated in the Revolution of Dignity. Russia took advantage of this political instability to annex Crimea in March 2014, though Ukraine still claims sovereignty over the territory.  Russia has also allegedly supported separatist forces in the War in Donbas.  In December 2015 Russian hackers reportedly hacked Ukraine's power grids leading to a blackout and widespread terror.

On 24 February 2022, diplomatic relations were cut with Russia as a response to the Russian invasion of Ukraine.

Moldova

Moldova and Ukraine have established joint customs posts to monitor transit through Moldova's break-away Transnistria Region which remains under OSCE supervision.

Romania

Ukraine and Romania have settled their dispute over the Ukrainian-administered Zmiyinyy (Snake) Island and the Black Sea maritime boundary at the International Court of Justice. The CIA World Factbook states that "Romania opposes Ukraine's reopening of a navigation canal from the Danube border through Ukraine to the Black Sea".

Investment promotion
State enterprise InvestUkraine was created under the State Agency for Investment and National Projects (National Projects) to serve as a One Stop Shop for investors and to deliver investment consulting services.

Relations by country

Multilateral

Africa

Americas

Asia

Europe
Ukraine and all UN member states in Europe, except Belarus and Kazakhstan, are members of the Council of Europe.

Oceania

Regional blocs

See also
 Foreign policy of Ukraine
 List of diplomatic missions in Ukraine
 List of diplomatic missions of Ukraine

External links
 Гай-Нижник П. П. Росія проти України (1990–2016 рр.): від політики шантажу і примусу до війни на поглинання та спроби знищення. – К.: «МП Леся», 2017. – 332 с. 
State Agency for Investment and National Projects website (en)
 Ukraine: Quo Vadis?, edited by Sabine Fischer, Chaillot Paper No. 108, February 2008, European Union Institute for Security Studies

References